The New Beginning in Sapporo (2020) was a professional wrestling event promoted by New Japan Pro-Wrestling (NJPW). It took place on February 1 and 2, 2020 at the Hokkaido Prefectural Sports Center in Sapporo, Japan.

Production

Storylines
The New Beginning in Sapporo  featured professional wrestling matches that involve different wrestlers from pre-existing scripted feuds and storylines. Wrestlers portray villains, heroes, or less distinguishable characters in the scripted events that build tension and culminate in a wrestling match or series of matches.

Results

Night 1

Night 2

See also
2020 in professional wrestling
List of NJPW pay-per-view events

References

2020 in professional wrestling
February 2020 events in Japan
NJPW The New Beginning